Milano Residences, also known as The Milano Residences, is a residential high-rise condominium in Makati, Philippines. As of 2017, it is the 17th-tallest building in the Philippines. It is the first of several buildings built at the new Century City complex along Kalayaan Avenue by the Century City Development Corporation.

Location

The Milano Residences is located within the former location of the 4.8-hectare International School Manila, wherein 3.4 hectares was sold to Century Properties Corporation, while the remaining 1.4 hectares were sold to Picar Properties, in a bidding by the Philippine Government in 2007. Situated along Kalayaan Avenue, it is just a block away from the busy entertainment area along Makati Avenue. It is also about a few blocks away from the Makati Central Business District.

Architecture
The Milano Residences features a Versace-inspired design concept replicating Greek Fret, designed by world-renowned architectural firm Broadway Malyan. The building also features some Milan-inspired interior designs in both its units and its amenities.

Milano Piazza
Milano Piazza is an outdoor center for residents of Milano Residences. It is a relaxing open space with lush landscaping, fascinating water features and stylish lounge areas.

References

External links
 Official Website
 Official Website of the Century City
 Official Website of Century Properties

Skyscrapers in Makati
Residential skyscrapers in Metro Manila
Residential buildings completed in 2016
21st-century architecture in the Philippines